Dendrobium pugioniforme, commonly known as the dagger orchid is a species of orchid endemic to eastern Australia. It is an epiphytic or lithophytic orchid with pendulous, wiry stems, fleshy, sharply pointed  leaves and flowering stems with one or two greenish or yellowish flowers with a white labellum. It grows on trees and rocks, mostly in humid forest.

Description
The side lobes are short and curve upwards and the middle lobe curves upwards and has three wavy ridges. Flowering occurs from September to November.

Taxonomy and naming
Dendrobium pugioniforme was first formally described in 1839 by Allan Cunningham and the description was published in John Lindley's Edwards's Botanical Register. The specific epithet (pugioniforme) is derived from the Latin words pugio meaning "dagger" and forma meaning"shape".

Hybrids with the streaked rock orchid ( Dendrobium striolatum) have been recorded.

Distribution and habitat

Cultivation
Dendrobium pugioniforme adapts readily to cultivation, and can be grown in baskets in epiphytic orchid mix, or trained to grow on rock or bark slabs. It prefers a part-shaded position and extra moisture.

References 

pugioniforme
Endemic orchids of Australia
Orchids of New South Wales
Plants described in 1839